The following is a list of common metonyms.  A metonym is a figure of speech used in rhetoric in which a thing or concept is not called by its own name, but by the name of something intimately associated with that thing or concept. For instance, "Westminster", a borough of London in the United Kingdom, could be used as a metonym for the country's government.

Objects

Places

Africa

Asia

Europe

North America

South America

Notes

References

 
Narrative techniques